Orthaga auroviridalis is a species of snout moth in the genus Orthaga. It is known from Sikkim and Bhutan.

References

Moths described in 1896
Epipaschiinae